Craig Steven Fitschen (born January 17, 1967) is an American former handball player who competed in the 1988 Summer Olympics.

References

1967 births
Living people
American male handball players
Olympic handball players of the United States
Handball players at the 1988 Summer Olympics
Pan American Games bronze medalists for the United States
Medalists at the 1991 Pan American Games
Pan American Games medalists in handball